Daniel Leites (born February 28, 1982 in Montevideo) is a Uruguayan footballer currently a free agent after being released by Villa Teresa in January 2016.

External links
 
 

1982 births
Living people
Uruguayan footballers
Uruguayan expatriate footballers
Uruguayan Primera División players
Club Nacional de Football players
Montevideo Wanderers F.C. players
Centro Atlético Fénix players
C.A. Cerro players
Tiro Federal footballers
Cerro Largo F.C. players
Expatriate footballers in Argentina
Association football defenders